Abbas Aghazade (born 10 February 1999) is an Azerbaijani footballer who plays as a midfielder for Azerbaijani club Sabah.

Career
On 9 July 2019, Aghazade signed a three-year contract with Sabah. He made his debut in the Azerbaijan Premier League on 19 August, starting in a 1–1 draw against Neftçi.

References

External links
 
 

1999 births
Living people
Azerbaijani footballers
Association football midfielders
Gabala FC players
MOIK Baku players
Sabah FC (Azerbaijan) players
Azerbaijan Premier League players